Yau gok or jau gok are traditional dumplings found within Cantonese cuisine originating from Guangdong Province in China.  They are most common during Chinese New Year and are consumed in Cantonese-speaking regions and communities, including Hong Kong and Malaysia.

Names

There are quite a number of unofficial English names associated with this dish:
 Oil dumplings
 Peanut Puff
 Crispy triangles
 Fried oil dumplings
 New year dumplings
 Chinese new year dumplings
 Oil horn
 Pot stickers

Preparation
The dumpling wrap is first made of glutinous rice dough.  A dumpling shape is formed, and then a batch of dumplings are deep fried in a wok.

Salty
The savory version are generally called haam gok zai.  There is a range of popular fillings that varies depending on regional culture.  Common ingredients include pork, pieces of Chinese sausages, pieces of Chinese black mushroom.

Sweet coconut
The sweet coconut version are generally called tim gok zai.  The standard filling has desiccated (dried) coconut crumbs mixed with sugar.  After the frying, this version is crunchy.  This version is suitable for vegetarians.

See also
 Jiaozi
 Jian dui
 List of deep fried foods

References

Cantonese cuisine
Cantonese words and phrases
Chinese New Year foods
Deep fried foods
Dim sum
Dumplings